Eicochrysops pinheyi is a butterfly in the family Lycaenidae. It is found in Zambia.

References

Butterflies described in 1985
Eicochrysops